Rangoon Rowdy is a 1979 Telugu drama film directed by Dasari Narayana Rao and produced by Vadde Sobhanadri under Vijaya Madhavi Pictures. The film was presented by Vadde Kishore. The film stars Mahanati Savitri, Krishnam Raju, Jaya Prada, Mohan Babu and Deepa in the lead roles. The music was composed by J. V. Raghavulu. The song "o jabilee" is taken from the Hindi movie Muqaddar ka sikandar ". It is Krishnam Raju's 100th film. It is the first Indian film to be shot in Burma.

Cast
Krishnam Raju as Raju
Jaya Prada as Indu / Rajani
Mohan Babu as Babu
Deepa as Deepa
Savitri as Deepa's mother
Sowcar Janaki as Janaki
Rao Gopal Rao as Gopal Rao
Prabhakar Reddy
Gokina Rama Rao as Rama Rao
Raavi Kondala Rao
Dhulipala as lawyer
 Mukkamala
 K. V. Chalam as Raju's friend
 Ceylon Manohar as Smuggler
 Nalinikanth as Gopal Rao's son.
 Master Nagoor (Mano) as young Raju
 Tulasi

References

External links
 

1979 films
Films set in Myanmar
Films directed by Dasari Narayana Rao
Indian drama films
Films scored by J. V. Raghavulu
1970s Telugu-language films